Turbo scitulus, common name the Galapagos turban, is a species of sea snail, a marine gastropod mollusk in the family Turbinidae, the turban snails.

Notes
Additional information regarding this species:
 Taxonomic status: Some authors place the name in the subgenus Turbo (Marmarostoma)

Description
The length of the purple shell varies between 25 mm and 31 mm.

Distribution
This species occurs in the Pacific Ocean in the subtidal and intertidal zone off the Galapagos Islands.

References

External links
 To Encyclopedia of Life
 To World Register of Marine Species
 
 Darwin foundation .org: Galapagos species checklist

scitulus
Gastropods described in 1919